Dragon is a 2011 Hong Kong-Chinese martial arts film directed by Peter Chan, and starring Donnie Yen, Takeshi Kaneshiro and Tang Wei. Yen also served as the film's action director. It premiered on 13 May 2011 at the 2011 Cannes Film Festival in the Midnight Screenings category. 

Donnie Yen and Peter Chan presided over the lighting of a 3591-square-metre billboard for Dragon that broke the record in the Guinness Book of World Records for its size, a record previously held by a poster for a Michael Jackson album.

Plot
In 1917 Republican China, Liu Jinxi and his wife Yu are an ordinary couple with two sons, Fangzheng and Xiaotian, living together in Liu Village, Yunnan. One day, two bandits enter the village and attempt to rob the general store. Liu  happens to be in the shop, and he fights and kills the robbers when they turn violent. During an autopsy, the detective Xu Baijiu, who is sent to investigate the case, discovers that one of the dead bandits was Yan Dongsheng, who is among the government's ten most wanted fugitives. The local magistrate is pleased, and his fellow villagers regard Liu  as a hero.

However, Xu becomes suspicious because he does not believe Liu could accidentally defeat such a formidable bandit. Xu notes signs of brain hemorrhaging due to an injury to Yan Dongsheng's vagus nerve. From this and other evidence, Xu concludes that Liu is in fact a highly skilled martial artist who conceals his talent through misdirection. Investigating further, Xu discovers Liu's true identity: Tang Long, the second-in-command of the 72 Demons, a group of vicious and bloodthirsty warriors. Liu admits his past but states that he has reformed. Xu, an uncompromising lawman, does not accept that people can change, but he is perplexed when Liu fails to kill him when they are alone.

Xu immediately returns to the county office to obtain an arrest warrant for Tang Long. The magistrate delays issuing the warrant, citing lack of evidence while actually soliciting a bribe from Xu. Xu eventually obtains the bribe money from his estranged wife, who blames him for causing her father's suicide. After issuing the warrant, the magistrate informs the Master of the 72 Demons of Tang Long's whereabouts, hoping to receive a reward. Offended, the Master reveals that Liu is his son, and he kills the magistrate. The Master sends his henchmen to Liu Village to capture Liu and raze the village.

While Xu and the constables are on their way there, two henchmen reach the village and kill a villager to force Liu to acknowledge his identity. Liu kills one of the two assailants and runs away. The other assailant, the Master's wife, chases Liu and fights with him in the buffalo shed, where she is crushed in a stampede and nearly falls into a river. As Liu attempts to save her, she tells him that he is still Tang Long. She falls to her death, and the remaining villagers flee to a fortress for safety. Xu's deputies decline to save the village, preferring to wait for Liu and the 72 Demons to kill each other.

Using his knowledge of physiology, Xu devises a plan to fake Liu's death. However, the ruse continues too long, and Xu is forced to revive Liu in front of the 72 Demons, who have assembled to pay respect to their fallen comrade. As a sign of his dedication, Liu severs his left arm, announcing that he has broken all ties with them. The 72 Demons accept his statement but tell him that he must speak with the Master, who is waiting for him at his house. After a tense dinner in which the Master has taken Liu's family hostage, the Master announces that he will allow Liu to leave the 72 Demons, but Xiaotian's (Liu's son) has to take his place.

Enraged, Liu attacks the master with a broadsword, but the Master uses qigong to protect himself from the blade. Xu infiltrates the house through a hatch and, from underneath the floor, weakens the Master's defense during the fight by piercing his heel with an acupuncture needle. The Master incapacitates Xu and proceeds to overpower Liu. Before the Master can kill Liu, Xu attacks the Master with another acupuncture needle to the neck. The Master fatally wounds Xu, but the needles act as a lightning rod and earthing wire, and the Master is killed by a bolt of lightning. With his dying breath, Xu announces the case closed. Liu returns home, living a normal life with his family.

Cast
 Donnie Yen as Liu Jinxi, who is actually Tang Long, the son of the Master.
 Takeshi Kaneshiro as Xu Baijiu, a detective versed in physiology and acupuncture. He is a native of Wenjiang, Sichuan, so he speaks Sichuanese.
 Tang Wei as Yu, Liu Jinxi's wife.
 Jimmy Wang as the Master, the leader of the 72 Demons and Tang Long's father.
 Kara Hui as 13th Madam, the Master's wife.
 Li Xiaoran as Xu Baijiu's estranged wife
 Jiang Wu as Xu Baijiu's investigator
 Zheng Wei as Liu Fangzheng, Yu's son from her previous marriage who was adopted by Liu Jinxi.
 Li Jiamin as Liu Xiaotian, Liu Jinxi and Yu's son.
 Ethan Juan as the young convict, who poisoned his parents and attempted to kill Xu Baijiu.
 Chun Hyn as the tavern owner
 Wan To-shing as Xu Kun, one of the 72 Demons.
 Yu Kang as Yan Dongsheng, a wanted criminal killed by Liu Jinxi.

Production
Dragon began as a remake of One-Armed Swordsman, but, according to Twitch Film, these plans were "quickly abandoned". Still many plot details are influenced by Chang Cheh's 1970s classic, down to an appearance of veteran actor Jimmy Wang Yu, who portrayed the one armed swordsman in the original movie.

Release
The film topped China's box office and grossed over 100 million yuan (US$15.6 million) in its first opening week.

Reception
Justin Chang of Variety describes the film as "a satisfyingly sinewy fusion of martial-arts actioner and brain-tickling noir from busy producer-director Peter Ho-sun Chan. Channeling David Cronenberg's A History of Violence by way of 1917 China, this clever if over-amped thriller tackles themes of identity, honor and the latent killer instinct with a playful spirit that's never at odds with its underlying seriousness." Maggie Lee of The Hollywood Reporter describes it as "an exhilarating martial arts entertainment that modernizes the genre while re-emphasizing its strong points."

Awards and nominations
31st Hong Kong Film Awards
Nominated: Best Actress (Tang Wei)
Nominated: Best Supporting Actor (Jimmy Wang)
Nominated: Best Supporting Actress (Kara Hui)
Won: Best Cinematography
Nominated: Best Editing
Nominated: Best Art Direction
Nominated: Best Costume Design
Nominated: Best Action Choreography 
Nominated: Best Visual Effects
Won: Best Original Score
Nominated: Best Original Song

References

External links
 
 
 

2011 films
2011 action thriller films
Chinese action thriller films
Chinese martial arts films
Hong Kong action thriller films
Hong Kong martial arts films
Kung fu films
Wushu films
Wuxia films
Films set in 1917
Films set in Yunnan
Films directed by Peter Chan
2011 martial arts films
2010s Mandarin-language films
2010s Hong Kong films